The Ohio State Buckeyes women's ice hockey team represents Ohio State University in NCAA Division I competition in the Western Collegiate Hockey Association (WCHA) conference. The team plays in Columbus, Ohio at The Ohio State Ice Rink, located on the Ohio State campus.

History
The Buckeyes competed in the WCHA championship tournament in March 2001, defeating the St. Cloud State Huskies in the first round and No. 1 Minnesota Golden Gophers in the second round to advance to the championship game. The Buckeyes were defeated by eventual national champion Minnesota-Duluth Bulldogs. The Buckeyes had an 18–16–3 overall record, including 11–10–3 in the WCHA, and finished No. 8 in the national polls. During the regular season, they were 12–5–1 in their last 18 contests and finished 7–1–0.

The 2001–02 season saw the Buckeyes defeat several nationally ranked teams, including the No. 3 University of New Hampshire Wildcats and the No. 4 St. Lawrence Saints, and tie the No. 6 Dartmouth Big Green. Five players received postseason honors, including Jeni Creary, who was named the WCHA Rookie of the Year and All-WCHA First Team selection after leading the nation in scoring for the first half of the season, and Emma Terho , who earned JOFA/AHCA Second Team All-America accolades and All-WCHA Second Team honors despite missing ten games while representing her native Finland at the 2002 Winter Olympics.
 
In the 2006–07 season, the Buckeyes reached the 20-win mark for the first time in program history, finishing the season with a 20–13–4 record. They set a program record for the longest unbeaten streak at ten games (9–0–1, Oct. 28 – Dec. 8), posted a team-best 30 points in the WCHA with a 13–11–4 conference record and had a 12–5–3 home record while finishing fourth in the league standings. They swept the Minnesota State Mavericks in the best-of-three league playoff tournament and advanced to the WCHA semifinals against eventual national champion Wisconsin. The Buckeyes completed the season as the 10th-ranked team in both the USCHO.com and USA Hockey national polls.
 
Head coach Jackie Barto recorded her 200th career win November 24, 2007 with a 4–1 victory against St. Cloud State at the OSU Ice Rink.

In 2008, Tessa Bonhomme was Ohio State's first two-time Top 10 finalist for the Patty Kazmaier Memorial Award, given to the top Division I women's hockey student-athlete in the nation. She was also the team captain of the 2007–08 Buckeyes. Bonhomme was also named WCHA Player of the Year and WCHA Defensive Player of the Year, the first Buckeye to receive either award.

Jody Heywood was a two-time finalist for the Hockey Humanitarian Award in 2007 and 2008, the first Buckeye on either men's or women's teams to be a finalist for the award.

In 2009, Liana Bonanno became the program's first ESPN The Magazine Academic All-America at-large selection, earning a place on the third team.

Natalie Spooner scored 21 goals in 2009, leading the team and earning the program's No. 7 spot for single-season goals. She had a six-game point streak from Nov. 15 to Jan. 9 that included a five-game goal streak to tie for the second-longest in program history. On December 12, 2008, she set the program record for goals in a game with four in a 6–5 win at Minnesota State, including a natural hat trick in the second period in a span of 1:56.

The opening game of the 2009–10 season was Barto's 500th career game as coach.

Laura McIntosh was recognized as the WCHA offensive player of the week for October 19, 2011. She had a record-breaking weekend in the Buckeyes' conference series sweep of St. Cloud State, during which she was credited with four points, seven shots on goal and a +5 plus/minus rating. On October 14, she scored her first goal of the season and assisted on a Hokey Langan goal. The assist made McIntosh Ohio State's all-time leader in career points against WCHA opponents, surpassing Jana Harrigan's 110 league points in 2006. The following day, McIntosh scored two points, assisting on Ally Tarr's shorthanded game-winning goal and scoring the Buckeyes' third goal of the game.

Three players reached milestones in a January 27, 2012 defeat of the North Dakota Fighting Sioux. Spooner scored two goals, McIntosh had three assists and Langan had two assists. McIntosh's assists moved her into a tie at the top of the program's all-time career points list. Her 160 career points are now tied with Harrigan's. Spooner's goals were both on the power-play, bringing her season total to seven. With the goals, Spooner reached the 150 career point mark, good for third all-time in program history. Langan's assists helped her reach the 100-point milestone, only the eighth Buckeyes player to reach the mark.

They received an at large bid for the 2018 NCAA Women's Ice Hockey Tournament. They beat the Boston College Eagles 2–0 in the quarterfinals, making it to their first ever NCAA Women's Frozen Four. They lost in the semi-finals to Clarkson.

On March 8, 2020, the Buckeyes defeated the Wisconsin Badgers 1–0 in overtime to earn the program's first WCHA championship. They automatically qualified for the 2020 NCAA Women's Ice Hockey Tournament, but it was canceled due to the COVID-19 pandemic. They received an at large bid for the 2021 NCAA Women's Ice Hockey Tournament.

For the 2020/21 season the Buckeyes once again advanced to the WCHA Championship game, where they fell to the Wisconsin Badgers in overtime. In the National Tournament, they beat Boston College in the quarterfinals 3-1 but once again fell to Wisconsin in the Frozen Four

During the 2021/22 season, the Buckeyes reached the program's first 1 seed after defeating Minnesota 3–2 in overtime for the WCHA Championship, in the process earning both an automatic bid to the 2022 NCAA Women'sIceHockeyTournament and a home playoff game. The Buckeyes defeated the 7 seed Quinnipiac 4–3 in double overtime, sending them the program's 3rd Frozen Four. There, they beat #6 Yale 2–1, and won the program's first National Title two days later, beating Minnesota Duluth 3–2. Defenseman Sophie Jaques finished the season with 21 goals and 38 assists for 59 points total and was a Patty Kazmaier Award finalist. Her and head coach Nadine Muzerall became the USCHO's Player of the Year and Coach of the Year, respectively.

Season by season results

Coaches 
Barto served as the program's first head coach, leading the team from 1999 to 2011 and finishing with a record of 178–209–42 (.464). During her first ten years as head coach, the program received 14 All-WCHA honors. She served on the NCAA Women's Ice Hockey Championship Committee from 2000 to 2006 and is a member of the American Women's Hockey Coaches Association. She retired in April 2011 after 12 seasons at Ohio State.

In May 2011, Nate Handrahan became the program's second head coach. He coached the team for four seasons, finishing with a record of 67–64–15 (.507). He resigned on March 9, 2015, amid a sexual harassment investigation.

On April 12, 2015, Jenny Schmidgall-Potter was named the program's third head coach. She finished her single season with a record of 10–25–1 (.288).

In September 2016, Nadine Muzerall was named the program's fourth head coach.

Current roster
As of August 20, 2022.

Buckeyes in professional hockey

International
On the international level, Barto was an assistant coach in 1998 at the USA Hockey Women's Festival in Lake Placid, N.Y., where she was one of four head coaches in 1999. She was an assistant coach for the 2003 U.S. Women's Under-22 Select Team. She was a member of the selection committee for the 2006 Winter Olympic U.S. National Women's Hockey team. She was head coach of the U.S. Women's National and Select teams in 2007–08 and coached the U.S. Women's Select Team to a silver medal at the Four Nations Cup in November 2007. She was named head coach of the U.S. Women's Under-22 Team for 2008–09. She led the U.S. Women's National Team to the gold medal at the 2008 IIHF World Women's Championship in Harbin, China.

Spooner was a member of the Canadian National Women's Team for the 2008 4 Nations Cup. She competed for the 2009-10 Canada Under 22 Hockey team. On January 8, 2010, she scored 4:59 in overtime to give Canada's National Women's Under-22 Team a 4–3 victory over Sweden and send Canada to the gold medal game at the 2010 MLP Cup, where Canada won the gold medal.

Olympians

Individual awards and honors
 Tessa Bonhomme, Top 10 finalist for the Patty Kazmaier Memorial Award (2007)
 Tessa Bonhomme, Top 10 finalist for the Patty Kazmaier Memorial Award (2008)
 Tessa Bonhomme, WCHA Player of the Year 
 Tessa Bonhomme, WCHA Defensive Player of the Year 
 Tessa Bonhomme, Third Team All-USCHO (2006–07)
 Tessa Bonhomme, First Team All-WCHA (2006–07)
 Tessa Bonhomme, WCHA All-Tournament Team (2006–07) 
 Tessa Bonhomme, Buckeyes Most Valuable Defensive Player (2004–05) 
 Tessa Bonhomme, Buckeyes Most Valuable Freshman (2003–04).
 Liana Bonanno, ESPN The Magazine Academic All-America at-large selection, earning a place on the third team. 
 Jeni Creary, Top 10 finalist for the Patty Kazmaier Memorial Award (2002)
 Jeni Creary, WCHA Rookie of the Year (2002)
 Jeni Creary, All-WCHA First Team selection (2002)
 Rachel Davis, 2010 Frozen Four Skills Competition participant
 Jincy Dunne, WCHA Rookie of the Month, January 2017
 Jana Harrigan, AHCA Second Team All-America pick (2006)
 Jana Harrigan, Top 10 finalist for the Patty Kazmaier Memorial Award (2006)
 Jody Heywood, finalist, Hockey Humanitarian Award in 2007
 Jody Heywood, finalist, Hockey Humanitarian Award in 2008 
 Sophie Jaques, 2022 WCHA Defensive Player of the Year 
 Sophie Jaques, 2023 WCHA Defensive Player of the Year
 Sophie Jaques, 2023 WCHA Player of the Year
Sophie Jaques, Hockey Commissioner's Association National Player of the Month for March 2022 
Sophie Jacques, Top 3 Finalist, 2022 Patty Kazmaier Award
 Sophie Jaques, 2023 Patty Kazmaier Award
 Emma Laaksonen WCHA Student-Athlete of the Year (2004)
 Emma Laaksonen Top 10 finalist for the Patty Kazmaier Memorial Award (2002) 
 Emma Laaksonen, JOFA/AHCA Second Team All-America accolades (2002) 
 Emma Laaksonen, All-WCHA Second Team honors (2002) 
 Hokey Langan, 2010 Patty Kazmaier Award nominee
Nadine Muzerall, 2022 WCHA Coach of the Year 
 Corinne Rosen, WCHA all-tournament team (2001)
 Kassidy Sauvé, 2014–15 WCHA All-Rookie Team
 Natalie Spooner, 2010 and 2011 Patty Kazmaier Award nominee
 April Stojak, WCHA All-Tournament team (2001)

All-America recognition
 Tessa Bonhomme, AHCA All-America honors (2008)
 Tessa Bonhomme, AHCA Second Team All-America pick (2007)
 Jincy Dunne, 2017–18 Second Team All-America
Jincy Dunne, 2019-20 CCM Hockey Women's Division I All-American: First Team
 Jenn Gardiner, 2022–23 AHCA Second Team All-America
 Sophie Jaques, 2021–22 AHCA First Team All-America, 2022–23 AHCA First Team All-America
 Emma Laaksonen, 2001–02 AHCA Second Team All-America 
 Emma Maltais, 2019-20 CCM Hockey Women's Division I All-American: Second Team
 Kassidy Sauvé, 2016–17 Second Team All-America 
 Natalie Spooner, 2011–12 CCM Hockey Women's Division I All-American: Second Team

Frozen Four
Paetyn Levis, 2022 NCAA Frozen Four Most Outstanding Player

See also
 Ohio State Buckeyes men's ice hockey
 List of college women's ice hockey coaches with 250 wins

References

External links

 

 
Ice hockey teams in Ohio